Folktronica is a genre of music comprising various elements of folk music and electronica, often featuring uses of acoustic instruments – especially stringed instruments – and incorporating hip hop, electronic or dance rhythms, although it varies based on influences and choice of sounds. The Ashgate Research Companion to Popular Musicology describes folktronica as "a catch-all [term] for all manner of artists who have combined mechanical dance beats with elements of acoustic rock or folk like IXIM or Nicola cruz."

The 1991 album Every Man and Woman is a Star by Ultramarine is credited as a progenitor of the genre; it featured a pastoral sound and incorporated traditional instruments such as violin and harmonica with techno and house elements. In the early 2000s, artists such as Four Tet, Isan, and Gravenhurst were lumped into a folktronica "scene" by the media and press. According to The Sunday Times Culture's Encyclopedia of Modern Music, essential albums of the genre are Four Tet's Pause (2001), Tunng's Mother's Daughter and Other Songs (2005), and Caribou's The Milk of Human Kindness (2005).

See also

List of folktronica artists

References

 
Electronica
Electronic music genres
Contemporary folk subgenres
British styles of music